Connor Dantzler (born February 23, 1994), of Damascus, Maryland, is an accomplished youth American amateur athlete. In 2000, at the age of six, under the tutelage of his father Mark Dantzler, he won his first junior national title in his age bracket. By 2012, Dantzler had won US national championship titles in judo, jujitsu, and powerlifting and earned awards as an AAU All-America and Athlete of the Year.

Biography
Dantzler discovered powerlifting as a youth while searching the internet with his father for other sports to complement his judo training. As a teen, he earned World and Pan-American gold medals in the sport. He appeared in Sports Illustrated's "Faces in the Crowd" at the age of ten. In 2005, he made a guest appearance on ABC’s The Tony Danza Show. In 2010 Dantzler earned the Joel Ferrell Memorial Award for Outstanding Performance, “…an award that recognizes outstanding athletic accomplishments and sportsmanship at the AAU Junior Olympic Games”. In 2011, he set an American record in his age category at the Collegiate Powerlifting National Championships as a high school student.

Dantzler volunteers as a youth instructor to boys and girls in his hometown of Damascus, MD. Since becoming a national judo coach at his father's dojo in 2010, his students have won individual junior national championship titles. The President's Council on Fitness, Sports, and Nutrition named Dantzler a recipient of the Community Leadership Award  for mentoring junior athletes. Dantzler’s past work in the community was reflected in other notable honors, including the PARADE All-America High School Service Team, Prudential Spirit of Community Awards, the Good Samaritan Medal, a US Senate commendation, and two State of Maryland Governor’s Citations.

Connor Dantzler's past articles on the benefits of fitness and sports appeared in Natural Muscle Magazine, Real Gainz Fitness Magazine, USA Judo Magazine, USJF Judo Magazine, and Muscle and Brawn.

References 

1994 births
Living people
People from Damascus, Maryland
American powerlifters